The ancient Romans had a variety of toys and games. Children used toys such as tops, marbles, wooden swords, kites, whips, seesaws, dolls, chariots, and swings. Gambling and betting were popular games in ancient Rome. Legislation heavily regulated gambling, however, these laws were likely not enforced. Tali, Terni lapilli, Duodecim Scripta, and Ludus Latrunculorum were all popular games in ancient Rome. They were similar to poker, tic-tac-toe, backgammon, and chess respectively. Nine men's morris may also have been a popular game in ancient Rome. Roman children also played games simulating historical battles and could pretend to be important government officials.

Gambling and betting 

Gambling and betting were popular games in ancient Rome. Although these games were heavily regulated, these laws were lifted during the holiday of Saturnalia. There is in any case little evidence that regulations against gambling were well-enforced. Ammianus Marcellinus describes a "gambling mania" which was pervasive across all Roman social classes. According to Marcellinus, most members of the upper classes did not wish to identify themselves as gamblers, instead preferring the term "dicer." Numerous Roman emperors, such as Augustus and Claudius were known for playing dice. The majority of ancient Roman dice were asymmetrical. It is possible the ancient Romans thought that the results of dice games were determined by fate rather than mathematical probability. Dice were sometimes stored in a fritillus, or a dice box, shaped like a wooden tower with a spiral inside. The box was used to roll dice in a manner that prevented player intervention, and therefore cheating.

Tali  
Tali, also known as astragali or knucklebones was an ancient Roman dice game similar to poker. It used two kinds of dice. One kind was a large die with only four marks. It only had the numbers 1, 2, 3, and 6. Each player had four dice, and would throw them as part of the game. If all dice had landed on a different number, it was called a Venus or Royal. If all the dice had landed on the number one, then it was known as the dogs or four vultures. If the player threw a dogs then they would put materials in the pot. If they threw a Venus then they would claim all of the wagered material. In another version of this game, players would throw knucklebones into the air and try to catch them as they fell down. The winner was the player who could catch the most.

Duodecim scripta 

One popular dice game was known as Twelve Lines, Twelve Signs, Twelve Points, Twelve Writings, and was similar to backgammon. Rounded bone pieces were used to play this game. They could be a variety of colors. Such as blue, black, green, or red. The playing tables, which were known as the alveolus, were usually made from limestone or marble, although they could be made from leather and possibly wood. Each player had 15 pieces and placed them on a playing table divided into three horizontal lines with 12 spaces. Most boards consisted of 3 boxes by 12 boxes. Some boards used squares, letters, lines, circles, monograms, crescents, or crosses instead of boxes. It was also common for boxes to contain six letter words. Players would roll dice and the number it landed on determined the movement of the pieces. They could use the points they rolled on multiple pieces or combine them and move one piece. Each piece moves clockwise. Pieces blocked from moving were known as intici. The goal of the game was to move all of one player's pieces from one side of the board to the other.

Others 

Another popular game was known as Ludus Latrunculorum or Robbers. It was similar to chess. In this game each counter had a different value and the goal was to capture the opponent's pieces. This game was especially popular with soldiers. Terni lapilli, or three pebbles, was an ancient Roman board game played on a board with a nine-square grid. It was similar to tic-tac-toe, but they used three stones instead of marks. Nine men's morris might have been played in ancient Rome. Ovid possibly describes the game in Ars Amatoria. Ovid wrote: There is another game divided into as many parts as there are months in the year. A table has three pieces on either side; the winner must get all the pieces in a straight line. It is a bad thing for a woman not to know how to play, for love often comes into being during play.Seneca the Younger describes young children pretending to be senators or other magistrates. Children were said to have played games simulating the Battle of Actium. The children used a nearby pond to simulate the Adriatic sea, and they took different sides and fought in the streets.

Toys 

For most children, their toys were made by their parents. Children in wealthier families usually had toys made by skilled craftsmen. Different age groups had different toys. Babies usually had charms, bells, and whistles shaped like animals, and rattles known as crepundia. They could be made from either wood, pottery, bone, or clay. Pebbles were sometimes placed inside these toys. Toddlers were given wooden carts to help them learn to walk. Older male children had toy horses made from sticks. They could be accompanied by toy chariots. Wealthy children could have toy chariots large enough to be pulled by geese or goats. Children could have races between toy chariots driven by mice. Dolls were popular toys for ancient Roman girls. They were usually made out of cloth and wax. It was common for them to have movable arms and legs. Figures of gladiators, actors, soldiers, and slaves were popular toys. Other common toys included tops, marbles, wooden swords, kites, whips, seesaws, and swings. Wooden wheels and metal hoops were used as toys by ancient Roman children.

See also
Bear games

References

Bibliography 

 
 
 
 
 
 
 
 
 
 
 
 
 
 
 
 
 
 
 
 
 
 
 
 
 
 
 
 
 
 
 
 
 
 
 
 
 
 

Ancient Roman culture
History of games
Toy culture